Robert "Bob" Brooks is an American politician. He is a former Republican member of the Pennsylvania House of Representatives, representing the 54th district from 2018 to 2023. Previously, he served as a city councillor and mayor in Murrysville, Pennsylvania.

Political career

Brooks was a member of the City Council in Murrysville, Pennsylvania, and was Mayor of Murrysville from 2010 to 2018. In 2015, he was named Pennsylvania's Mayor of the Year by the Pennsylvania State Mayors Association.

In 2018, he ran for election to represent the 54th district in the Pennsylvania House of Representatives. The Republican primary was a four-way race, which Brooks won with 35% of the vote. He went on to win the general election with 59.8% of the vote.

He currently sits on the following House committees:
 Commerce
 Finance
 Local Government
 Urban Affairs (Subcommittee Chair on Cities, Third Class)

Electoral record

References

Living people
Republican Party members of the Pennsylvania House of Representatives
Year of birth missing (living people)
People from Murrysville, Pennsylvania
Mayors of places in Pennsylvania
21st-century American politicians